Peter Reed (born 21 September 1943) is a British athlete. He competed in the men's long jump at the 1968 Summer Olympics.

References

1943 births
Living people
Athletes (track and field) at the 1968 Summer Olympics
British male long jumpers
Olympic athletes of Great Britain
Place of birth missing (living people)